Tamasariya  is a village development committee in Nawalparasi District in the Lumbini Zone of southern Nepal. At the time of the 1991 Nepal census it had a population of 6942 people living in 1195 individual households. It is located between Madyabindu community forest and river Girubari. The economy of the VDC is highly depended on remittance. Most of the people are engaged in animal husbandry and farming. Chormara is generally referred to as a big market area of the region that includes tamasariya village development committee (VDC) and narayani VDC. It serves as administrative headquarters for Tamsariya VDC.

References

Populated places in Nawalpur District